A Date with Darkness: The Trial and Capture of Andrew Luster is a 2003 American made-for-television drama film based on a true story about criminal Andrew Luster. It originally premiered on Lifetime on August 11, 2003.

Plot
On July 14, 2000, in Ventura County, California, young Connie is raped by the Max Factor heir Andrew Luster after ingesting a drug called Liquid X in a glass of water offered by him in a nightclub. With the support of her father, she reluctantly decides to go to the police and gives them snapshots of the occurrence. While Connie and the police collect evidence to send Andrew to the jury and during the investigation, two other victims of Andrew, Sarah and Teri, are found and join the accusation.  He is placed on trial, but escapes during the proceedings.  Under Federal regulations, the trial proceeds in absentia, and he is convicted.

The movie started shooting while Luster was still on the run, and was originally supposed to end with a plea for information regarding his whereabouts. However, while the film was in production, he was captured in Mexico by Duane "Dog" Chapman and returned to the country to serve an effective life sentence of 104 to 124 years.  As a result, Luster's capture was written into the film at the last minute.

Cast
 Jason Gedrick - Andrew Luster
 Marla Sokoloff - Connie
 Lisa Edelstein - Maeve Fox
 Sarah Carter - Sarah
 Stefanie von Pfetten - Teri
 Winston Rekert - Fred
 Tom Butler - Roger Diamond
 Shane Meier - Daniel
 Robert Wisden - Sam
 Samantha Ferris - Det. Katherine Cooke
 Kevin McNulty - Judge Riley
 Kavan Smith - Anthony Wold
 Jody Thompson - Alli morgan
 Rebecca Toolan - Mrs. Luster
 Kerry Sandomirsky - Dr. Dyer
 Karl Schreiner - Sean
 Summer Gibson-Lefaive - Megan
 José Vargas - Taco Stand Vendor
 Jennifer Renton - Woman in Bar
 Carson Roy - Boy Twin
 Kwesi Ameyaw - Newscaster
 Sophie Olsen - Nurse
 Paula Lee - Court Reporter

External links 

nytimes.com

2003 drama films
Drama films based on actual events
Lifetime (TV network) films
Films directed by Bobby Roth
Films scored by Christopher Franke
2003 films
American drama television films
2000s American films